Tsantil is a rural locality (a selo) in Khuriksky Selsoviet, Tabasaransky District, Republic of Dagestan, Russia. The population was 285 as of 2010.

Geography 
Tsantil is located 12 km northwest of Khuchni (the district's administrative centre) by road. Pilig is the nearest rural locality.

References 

Rural localities in Tabasaransky District